Ninh Hòa is a district-level town (thị xã) of Khánh Hòa province in the South Central Coast region of Vietnam. As of 2003 the town had a population of 227,630. The district covers an area of 1,199 km². The district capital lies at Ninh Hòa.

Administrative divisions
Ninh Hòa is subdivided into
 7 wards: Ninh Hiệp, Ninh Giang, Ninh Đa, Ninh Hà, Ninh Diêm, Ninh Thủy and Ninh Hải.
 20 communes: Ninh Sơn, Ninh Thượng, Ninh Tây, Ninh Trung, Ninh An, Ninh Thọ, Ninh Sim, Ninh Xuân, Ninh Thân, Ninh Bình, Ninh Quang, Ninh Phú, Ninh Phước, Ninh Vân, Ninh Ích, Ninh Lộc, Ninh Hưng, Ninh Tân, Ninh Đông and Ninh Phụng.

References

Districts of Khánh Hòa province
County-level towns in Vietnam